D. B. Cooper is a media epithet used to describe an unidentified man who hijacked a Boeing 727 on November 24, 1971, extorted a US$200,000 ransom (equivalent to $ today), and parachuted to an unknown fate. He was never seen again, and only $5,880 of the ransom money has been found. The incident continues to influence popular culture, and has inspired references in books, film, and music.

Literature

Non-fiction books

General investigation 

 D.B. Cooper:  Dead or Alive? by Richard T. Tosaw (1984).
 Skyjack: The Hunt for D.B. Cooper by Geoffrey Gray (2011).
 DB Cooper and the FBI: A Case Study of America’s Only Unsolved Skyjacking by Bruce Smith (2015 1st Edition; 2016 2nd Edition; 2021 3rd Edition).
 D.B. Cooper and Flight 305: Reexamining the Hijacking and Disappearance by Robert H. Edwards (2021).

Suspect/conspiracy theories 

 D.B. Cooper: What Really Happened by Max Gunther (1985).
 Into the Blast by Skipp Porteous and Robert Blevins (2011).
 D.B. Cooper:  Examined, Identified, and Exposed by Nat Loufoque (2019).
 The Last Master Outlaw:  The Award-Winning Conclusion of the D.B. Cooper Mystery by Thomas J. Colbert (2021).

Novels 
James M. Cain's 1975 novel Rainbow's End is a fictional account of what might have happened to Cooper after he parachuted from the plane.
J.D. Reed's 1980 novel Free Fall was used as a basis for the 1981 film The Pursuit of D. B. Cooper.
Elwood Reid's 2004 novel D. B.: a novel is a fictionalized account of what supposedly happened to the real Cooper in the years following the hijacking, as a pair of FBI agents attempt to pick up his trail and arrest him.  In one edition, the book jacket cover featured artwork derived from the FBI composite sketch of the real Cooper.
The 1998 novel Sasquatch by Roland Smith features a character named Buckley Johnson, who eventually admits that he is D. B. Cooper to the novel's protagonist, a boy named Dylan Hickock. In this story, Johnson says he committed the hijacking to pay for cancer treatments for his son.
Greg Cox's 2008 novel The 4400: The Vesuvius Prophecy features Cooper (see also the television series The 4400).
The hijacking is a central plot point of the 2021 novel Bloodless by Douglas Preston and Lincoln Child.
D.L. Hynes' 2020 novel The Man in 18-E, the first of a trilogy of fantasy novels involving historical mysteries, features two accidental time-travelers who find themselves in 1971 and, unable to return, decide to travel to Portland to solve the D.B. Cooper case as it happens.

Short stories 
 In the SCP Foundation collaborative writing project, D.B. Cooper is featured in SCP-101 - Hungry Bag. In the short story, the body of Cooper was found in 1979 in the Cascade Mountains alongside SCP-101, having died from blood loss due to the bag biting his arm off and consuming it. Cooper's fate was classified by the SCP Foundation as part of their recovery of SCP-101. Another version of D.B. Cooper is featured in SCP-5017 - Hard Landing, in which Cooper is depicted as an immortal Druid by the name of Cathbhadh who has been fighting against the Foundation for 2000 years.

Comics 

The Dilbert strip for January 17, 1991, featured Dogbert exhibiting Cooper's remains, with the punchline, "He learned that you should never get your parachutes from the same people you're robbing".
The webcomic xkcd has a strip titled "D. B. Cooper", in which it was theorized that actor/director Tommy Wiseau was D. B. Cooper, and had financed his infamous film The Room with the funds from the robbery. A later xkcd strip posited that Cooper had been stranded alive in a tree since his jump.
A 1989 strip from Gary Larson's The Far Side shows "Ben & Vera's Rottweiler Farm" and a bunch of dogs looking up at a man with a parachute with the slogan "The Untold Ending of D.B. Cooper".

Film and television

Film 

 A 1981 adventure movie titled The Pursuit of D. B. Cooper, directed by Roger Spottiswoode and starring Treat Williams as Cooper and Robert Duvall as an insurance investigator pursuing him; based on J. D. Reed's 1980 novel Free Fall.
 In the movie Without a Paddle (2004),  a group of three old friends  (Matthew Lillard, Seth Green and Dax Shepard), go on a camping trip to search for the treasure of D. B. Cooper to honor their recently deceased friend.
 The Mystery of D.B. Cooper is a documentary about the case by John Dower.

Series and television 

 In the fourth season (1979–1980) of the series  In Search of... dedicated an episode to the D.B. Cooper hijacking.
 The main character of the television series Twin Peaks (1990) is named Dale Bartholomew Cooper, after D. B. Cooper.
 Muse Watson portrays Charles Westmoreland, revealed to be D.B. Cooper in the television series Prison Break.
 The first episode of the Disney+ series Loki, set in the Marvel Cinematic Universe and titled "Glorious Purpose", Cooper is revealed to be Loki, who hijacked the plane after having lost a bet to Thor and disappeared into the Bifrost after jumping from the rear stairs. Unlike the real Cooper, however, Loki's jump is seen to take place during daylight and in calm weather.
  On July 13, 2022 Netflix released a four-part documentary mini-series entitled D.B. Cooper: Where Are You?! exploring the hijacking incident and exploring the identity of D.B. Cooper.
The eighth episode of the second season of AMC's crime drama Breaking Bad, "Better Call Saul", includes a scene in which lawyer Saul Goodman jokingly refers to series protagonist Walter White as Cooper due to his sunglasses and unusual attire.

Music

 The Mountain Goats' song "Rain in Soho" (from the album Goths) references Cooper with the lyric "No one broke D. B. Cooper's fall".

Other

The community of Ariel, Washington, one of the possible landing areas for Cooper, commemorates the incident with a celebration, held annually on the Saturday following Thanksgiving Day, called "D. B. Cooper Days."
 D. B. Tuber is the name given to Anthony Curcio, who was responsible for one of the most elaborately planned armored car heists in history.
Fan speculation surrounding the show Mad Men was that there were subtle clues that it would end with Don Draper exposing himself as D.B. Cooper. Producers frequently denied such a plot, and the skyjacking was never depicted in the series.

References

Cultural depictions of robbers
Cultural depictions of American men
Aviation fiction
Fiction set in 1971
Oregon in fiction
Washington (state) in fiction